Wil Roebroeks (born 5 May 1955) is the professor of Palaeolithic Archaeology at Leiden University in the Netherlands. He is widely considered to be the pre-eminent Dutch archaeologist. In 2001 he became a member of the influential Royal Netherlands Academy of Arts and Sciences. In 2007 Roebroeks won the Spinozapremie, the most prestigious scientific award in the Netherlands.

Career
Wil Roebroeks was born on 5 May 1955 in Sint Geertruid. He began his academic career as a history student at the Radboud University Nijmegen where he graduated cum laude in 1979. He then studied prehistory at Leiden University, graduating in 1982. In 1989 he obtained his PhD from the same university, again graduating cum laude. In 1991 he won the Eureka! prijs award for his popular science work Oermensen in Nederland. In 1996 he became a professor at Leiden University.

In 2005 Roebroeks achieved international fame when challenging the Out of Africa theory in Nature. In another article in the same journal Roebroeks published on the discovery of stone tools in Great Britain, older than expected and contradicting the previously held belief that Northern Europe was settled much later than the lands surrounding the Mediterranean Sea.

In 2007 the Nederlandse Organisatie voor Wetenschappelijk Onderzoek awarded Roebroeks the Spinozapremie. The jury report highlighted his various original contributions to the study of human prehistory and called him the most prominent Dutch archaeologist nationally and internationally.

In 2009 Roebroeks again made the international news with his work on Krijn, the first Dutch Neanderthal fossil. This discovery prompted him to argue for the founding of a North-Sea Institute to deal with the archaeological material found in that sea.

In 2012 he published an article about the earliest ochre use of early Neandertals. The discovery was made at the Maastricht-Belvédère archaeological site which has an estimated age of 250.000 BP.

Publications
Roebroeks has published in a number of academic journals including Current Anthropology, Nature and the Journal of Human Evolution. What follows is a selection of his most prominent publications:

References

1955 births
Living people
20th-century Dutch archaeologists
Academic staff of Leiden University
Members of the Royal Netherlands Academy of Arts and Sciences
People from Eijsden-Margraten
Leiden University alumni
Radboud University Nijmegen alumni
Spinoza Prize winners
21st-century Dutch archaeologists